Genésio Goulart (10 April 1954 – 8 March 2021) was a Brazilian politician.

Biography
Genésio was the son of João Egino and Maria Souza Goulart. He served on the Municipal Council of Tubarão from 1992 to 1996 and subsequently served as the city's mayor from 1997 to 2000. He served on the Legislative Assembly of Santa Catarina from 2003 to 2011.

Genésio Goulart died in Tubarão on 8 March 2021 at the age of 66.

References

1954 births
2021 deaths
Members of the Legislative Assembly of Santa Catarina
People from Tubarão
Brazilian Democratic Movement politicians
Neurological disease deaths in Santa Catarina (state)
Deaths from neurodegenerative disease